See Sigeberht II of Essex for the Saxon ruler by that name.

Sigebert II (601–613) or Sigisbert II, was the illegitimate son of Theuderic II, from whom he inherited the kingdoms of Burgundy and Austrasia in 613. However, he fell under the influence of his great-grandmother, Brunhilda. Warnachar, mayor of the palace of Austrasia had Sigebert brought before a national assembly, where he was proclaimed king by the nobles over both his father's kingdoms.  However, when the kingdom was invaded by Clotaire II of Neustria, Warnachar and Rado, mayor of the palace of Burgundy, betrayed Sigebert and Brunhilda and joined with Clotaire, recognising Clotaire as rightful regent and guardian of Sigebert and ordering the army not to oppose the Neustrians. Brunhilda and Sigebert met Clotaire's army on the Aisne, but the Patrician Aletheus, Duke Rocco, and Duke Sigvald deserted her host and Brunhilda and Sigebert were forced to flee, before being taken by Clotaire's men at Lake Neuchâtel.  Brunhilda, little Sigebert and Sigebert's younger brother Corbo were executed by Clotaire's orders, and Austrasia and Neustria were reunited under Clotaire's rule, who now ruled the entire kingdom of the Franks.

References

Merovingian kings
601 births
613 deaths
Monarchs who died as children
Medieval child monarchs
7th-century murdered monarchs
7th-century Frankish kings